This is a list of electricity-generating power stations in the U.S. state of Rhode Island, sorted by type and name. In 2020, Rhode Island had a total summer capacity of 2,129 MW through all of its power plants, and a net generation of 8,895 GWh. The corresponding electrical energy generation mix in 2021 was 91% natural gas, 2.2% wind, 2.5% biomass, 4.2% solar, and 0.1% hydroelectric. In May 2017, the first U.S. offshore wind farm began operating off Block Island.

Fossil fuel power plants

Natural Gas

Coal
There are no coal-fired power plants in Rhode Island.

Oil
There are no oil-fired power plants in Rhode Island.

Renewable resources

Hydroelectric

Wind

Small-scale wind (<1MW)

Solar

Biomass

Nuclear
There are no nuclear power plants in Rhode Island.

Power stations under construction or planned

Notes

See also

List of power stations in the United States
List of wind farms in the United States

References

Rhode Island
Power stations